Buer is the largest suburb of Gelsenkirchen in North Rhine-Westphalia.  The Hochstrasse in the heart of Buer is the largest shopping street in Gelsenkirchen.

History

In 1928, the adjoining cities of Buer, Gelsenkirchen, and Horst merged to form Gelsenkirchen-Buer, which was renamed Gelsenkirchen in 1930.

The Scholven/Buer synthetic oil plant was a bombing target of the Oil Campaign of World War II (the Buer town hall survived in nearly original form).

Notable people
 Gerd Faltings

Gelsenkirchen
Oil campaign of World War II